Eugene Field House may refer to:

Eugene Field House (Denver, Colorado), listed on the National Register of Historic Places (NRHP) in Southeast Denver
Eugene Field House (St. Louis), Missouri, a National Historic Landmark and NRHP-listed
Eugene Field House (Amherst, Massachusetts), a University of Massachusetts Amherst residence hall

See also
Field House (disambiguation)